Kalyves is a large village in Crete, Greece, the main village in the municipal unit of Armenoi. It is now a popular tourist resort that has maintained its Cretan character.

It is said that the Kalyves took their name from the makeshift accommodation (huts) built by the Arab pirates, when they invaded in 828 AD and occupied the area of Sarakinos near the village. Another version is that the name comes from the huts that the farmers built near their estates to stay in the summer, without having to return to their village every night.

Description

Kalyves is a picturesque, seaside village of Apokoronas, 19 km east of Chania, and is connected to the highway which links all four prefectures of Crete. Kalyves, Almyrida, and Plaka consist of the most popular resorts on Cape Drapanos, very well known for their sandy beaches. Apokoronas is also known as one of the greenest areas of Chania, popular for its amazing scenery, combined with hills, trees, mountains, beaches, and traditional architecture. 
   
Kalyves is built in an amphitheater form which, actually, hugs its coastline. Also known as a fishing village, it offers a big variety of natural activities, such as fishing, kayak, windsurfing, hiking, etc. The village is divided into two aspects by the river Xydas, lovely scenery with trees, ducks which make it a perfect wetland. Thanks to River Xydas and another river, Kyliaris, which flows west of the village- Kalives is located in a fertile valley and is full of green and surrounded by olive trees. The natural benefit of that is that during summer instead of the heat, the climate is mild.

According to its natural and geographical advantages, the village of Kalyves was inhabited centuries ago. From the ancient years, there are many excavations that prove its strategical significance considering also the fertility of the soil, thanks to the rivers. It borders from the west with the ancient town of Aptera.

Historical population

See also
List of settlements in the Chania regional unit

References

Populated places in Chania (regional unit)